Janetschekia is a genus of  dwarf spiders that was first described by E. Schenkel in 1939.  it contains only two species, both found in Albania, Austria, Germany, Italy, and Switzerland: J. monodon and J. necessaria.

See also
 List of Linyphiidae species (I–P)

References

Araneomorphae genera
Linyphiidae
Spiders of Asia